Lysinibacillus timonensis is a bacterium from the genus of Lysinibacillus which has been isolated from human skin.

References

Bacillaceae
Bacteria described in 2019